Ipomoea lobata, the fire vine, firecracker vine or Spanish flag (formerly Mina lobata), is a species of flowering plant in the family Convolvulaceae, native to Mexico and Brazil.

It has toothed and lobed leaves (hence lobata) and one-sided racemes of flowers, opening red and fading to yellow, cream and white. These colours are graded down the length of the flower spike. The effect is like a firework, hence one of its popular names "firecracker vine". The colours vaguely resemble the red and gold of Spain's national flag, hence its other common name "Spanish flag".

It has gained the Royal Horticultural Society’s Award of Garden Merit.

It is closely related to two other popular, award-winning climbing plants, Ipomoea indica (blue dawn flower) and Ipomoea tricolor (morning glory).

The name “Spanish flag” is also used for Lantana camara, an ornamental shrub.

References

External links

 Ipomoea versicolor photos 
 Flora Brasiliensis: Ipomoea versicolor

lobata
Flora of Brazil